Charles of Artois may refer to:

 Charles of Artois, Count of Eu (1394–1472)
 Charles of Artois, Count of Pézenas (1328–1385)

See also
 Charles d'Artois (1300–1346), Neapolitan nobleman and court official